Sandra Doorley is the District Attorney for Monroe County, New York and the first female to hold that office. Doorley took office in January 2012, succeeding Michael Charles Green for whom she served as First Assistant Distinct Attorney.

Education
Doorley obtained a bachelor's degree from the University at Albany and received her law degree from Syracuse University.

Career

In November 2011, Doorley was elected Monroe County District Attorney defeating Republican candidate Bill Taylor. Doorley garnered almost 60% of the vote and over 78,000 individual votes. She was sworn in on December 30, 2011 at the Rochester Girls and Boys Club. She became the first female to hold the office of District Attorney in Monroe County. Michael Charles Green (whom she succeeded) joined Doorley's office as an advisor  but left in February 2012 for another position. In 2015, Doorley switched her party affiliation to the GOP, and was reelected later that year in an election.

References

Living people
Year of birth missing (living people)
County district attorneys in New York (state)
Syracuse University alumni